Irina Borisivna Krush (born December 24, 1983) is an American chess Grandmaster. She is the first woman, and as of August 2022 the only woman, to earn the GM title while playing for the United States. Krush is an eight-time U.S. Women's Champion.

Early life
Irina Krush was born in Odessa, USSR (now Ukraine). She learned to play chess at age five, emigrating with her parents to Brooklyn that same year (1989).

Chess career
At age 14, Krush won the 1998 U.S. Women's Chess Championship to become the youngest U.S. women's champion ever. She has won the championship on seven other occasions, in 2007, 2010, 2012, 2013, 2014, 2015, and 2020.

In 1999, Krush took part in the "Kasparov versus the World" chess competition. Garry Kasparov played the white pieces and the Internet public, via a Microsoft host website, voted on moves for the black pieces, guided by the recommendations of Krush and three of her contemporaries, Étienne Bacrot, Elisabeth Pähtz and Florin Felecan. Kasparov said later that he lost control of the game at that point, and wasn't sure whether he was winning or losing.

Krush played in the Group C of the 2008 Corus Chess Tournament, a 14-player round-robin tournament held in Wijk aan Zee, the Netherlands. She finished in joint fifth place having scored 7/13 points after five wins (including the one against the eventual winner, Fabiano Caruana), four draws and four losses.

In 2013, she was awarded the Grandmaster title due to her results at the NYC Mayor's Cup International GM Tournament in 2001, Women's World Team Chess Championship 2013 and Baku Open 2013.

In 2022, she won the 2022 American Cup (Women's field) in a double-elimination format.  She tied with Jennifer Yu in the 2022 U.S. Women's Chess Championship but lost the playoff.

Team competitions 
Krush has played on the U.S. national team in the Women's Chess Olympiad since 1998. The U.S. team won the silver medal in 2004 and bronze in 2008. She also competed as part of the US team in the Women's World Team Chess Championship in 2009 and 2013.

She played for the team Manhattan Applesauce in the U.S. Chess League in 2015; she previously played for the New York Knights (2005–2011, 2013). Krush and her ex-husband, Canadian Grandmaster Pascal Charbonneau, have played in the United Kingdom league for Guildford-ADC.

In May 2020, Krush played for the USA team in the FIDE Online Nations Cup.

Writing 
Krush frequently contributes articles to Chess Life magazine and uschess.org.  Her article on earning her grandmaster title in 2013 was honored as the "Best of US Chess" that year.

Personal life
Krush attended Edward R. Murrow High School in Brooklyn. She graduated in International Relations from the New York University in 2006.

In March 2016, Hillary Clinton was a guest on the Steve Harvey television show. On the show, Krush appeared along with two actresses trying to impersonate Krush. The trio answered questions from host Steve Harvey and Clinton regarding her life and chess career. Clinton successfully identified the real Irina Krush.

In March 2020, she was hospitalized and treated for a "moderate" COVID-19 infection, then released to recover under quarantine at home.  While quarantined, she played in the Isolated Queens Swiss, an online women's blitz chess tournament.  She scored 7.5/10 in the tournament, putting her in joint second place, a half point behind tournament winner GM Alexandra Kosteniuk.

On January 18, 2023, Krush appeared on a primetime special of The Price Is Right and won the Clock Game, but she failed to advance to the Showcases.

Notes

References

External links
 
 
 
 
 
 
 
 

1983 births
Living people
American female chess players
Chess grandmasters
Female chess grandmasters
Chess woman grandmasters
Chess Olympiad competitors
Sportspeople from Odesa
Edward R. Murrow High School alumni
New York University alumni
Soviet emigrants to the United States
21st-century American women